Dow Diamond is a Minor League baseball stadium located in Midland, Michigan. It is the home of the Great Lakes Loons of the Midwest League. The Loons are affiliated with the Los Angeles Dodgers.

The stadium is located near Buttles, Ellsworth and State streets in Midland. The Dow Chemical Company, whose world headquarters are in Midland, donated the land for the stadium and also purchased the naming rights to the facility in 2006. The stadium name is a reference to both Dow's logo (a red diamond) and that "diamond" is a slang term for a baseball field.

History
Ground was broken for the ballpark on April 11, 2006. The park opened April 13, 2007 and on June 8, 2007 it was announced that Dow Diamond would host the 2008 Midwest League All Star Game, which was held on June 17, 2008.  The venue also hosted the 2017 Midwest League All Star Game.

Facility
The seating bowl can accommodate 3,100 persons, with an additional 100 on the Party Deck. The park features 12 luxury suites containing a total of 300 seats, a Green Room for waiting performers and 3 dressing rooms.

The Dow Diamond indoors is a year-round facility that can be rented for most any event and the facility's catering company can provide anything from hors d'œuvres for two dozen to a formal dinner for 200 or a reception for 2,000.

Outdoors, the Diamond can provide seating for 3,500 with the stage behind home plate; 5,500 with the stage behind second base or 9,000 with the stage in center field.

For exhibitions or trade shows within the infield/outfield, 50,000 ft² of Event Deck portable flooring and/or 10,000 ft² of DD2 covering for stage areas & road builds is available.

References

External links

 Great Lakes Loons

Minor league baseball venues
Baseball venues in Michigan
Midland, Michigan
Buildings and structures in Midland County, Michigan
Tourist attractions in Midland County, Michigan
Sports venues completed in 2007
Dow Chemical Company
Populous (company) buildings
Midwest League ballparks